Albula argentea, the silver sharpjaw bonefish, is a species of marine fish found in the tropical western Pacific Ocean.

Taxonomy and nomenclature
Bonefish were once believed to be a single species with a global distribution, but nine different species have since been identified. There are three identified species in the Atlantic and six in the Pacific.

Albula virgata (the longjaw bonefish) and Albula oligolepis (the smallscale bonefish) were formerly assigned to this species, but are now recognized as distinct.

References

Albuliformes
Fish of the Pacific Ocean
Taxa named by Johann Reinhold Forster
Fish described in 1801